Myriopteris wrightii, formerly known as Cheilanthes wrightii, is a species of cheilanthoid fern with the common name Wright's lipfern. It is native to the southwestern United States and northern Mexico.

Description
Myriopteris wrightii grows from a long creeping rhizome  that is 1 to 3 mm in diameter with brown scales often deciduous on older portions of stem. The leaves are clustered to somewhat scattered and 4 to 25 cm long and 1 to 4 cm wide. As the fronds first emerge, their vernation is circinate (tightly coiled). The leaf petiole is brown and grooved adaxially (upper side). The leaf color is medium green, sometimes with a silvery or bluish cast. The leaf blade is lanceolate to ovate-deltate in shape and 2-pinnate-pinnatifid at the base. The ultimate leaflets are oblong to linear with the largest 3 to 7 mm in length, and hairless on both upper and lower sides. The leaflets curl under at their edges to form a false indusium. The sori are discontinuous and concentrated on interrupted lateral lobes.

Range and habitat
Myriopteris wrightii is native to Arizona, New Mexico, and Texas in the United States, and northern Mexico. It grows on rocky slopes and ledges, usually on igneous substrates, at elevations from 300 to 2000 meters.

References

Works cited

wrightii
Ferns of Mexico
Ferns of the United States